Marius Johnsen (born 28 August 1981, in Kristiansand) is a Norwegian footballer defender. His older brother Espen Johnsen is a former professional goalkeeper.

Career
During the summer of 2005, he made his debut on the Norwegian national team.

In the end of 2006, Johnsen signed a loan contract with 1. FC Köln in the German 2. Bundesliga that expired at the end of the German 2. Bundesliga season in May. He made his debut for the German club pn 26 January 2007 victory against SV Wacker Burghausen. On 14 June 2007,  Lillestrøm SK officially announced the signing of Johnsen on a five-year deal.

Since he signed for Lillestrøm he has been constantly injured. On 25 August 2010, it was reported that he needed a knee surgery and would be out for at least a year, up to a year and a half.

Career statistics

Personal life
Johnsen has previously studied religion at the Agder University College, planning to teach history and/or religion at a college or University. Like the rest of his family, he is involved in the activities of the Norwegian Free Church. Like his brother, he has made a mark in the national press for publicly expressing his religious beliefs.

References

External links
 

1981 births
Living people
Norwegian footballers
Norway international footballers
IK Start players
1. FC Köln players
Lillestrøm SK players
2. Bundesliga players
University of Agder alumni
Sportspeople from Kristiansand
Expatriate footballers in Germany
Norwegian expatriate footballers
Eliteserien players
Association football defenders